Jesse Roth (born August 5, 1934) is an American physician and endocrinologist, currently at The Feinstein Institute for Medical Research. He received his BA in 1955 from Columbia University, his MD in 1959 from Albert Einstein College of Medicine. He completed a residency in internal medicine at Barnes-Jewish Hospital (Washington University School of Medicine, St. Louis) in 1961, and a fellowship in endocrinology at Bronx Veterans Administration Medical Center in 1963. 
Beginning with his fellowship work with Solomon Berson and Rosalyn Yalow, Jesse Roth's research career focused on insulin action. His laboratory at the National Institutes of Health elucidated much of what we know of the structure of the insulin receptor and intracellular mechanisms of insulin action.
Jesse Roth is a fellow of the American College of Physicians and was a recipient of the 1980 Gairdner Foundation International Award and in 1982 he received the American Diabetes Association's Banting Medal for Scientific Achievement.

References 

Albert Einstein College of Medicine alumni
Columbia University alumni
American diabetologists
1934 births
Living people
Washington University School of Medicine people